Arhopala aurea is a species of butterfly belonging to the lycaenid family described by William Chapman Hewitson in 1862. It is found in  Southeast Asia (Peninsular Malaya, Singapore and Sumatra).

References

Arhopala
Butterflies described in 1862
Butterflies of Asia
Taxa named by William Chapman Hewitson